Sir Allen Stanley Brown  (3 July 19112 August 1999) was a senior Australian Public Servant. He was Secretary of the Prime Minister's Department between August 1949 and December 1958.

Life and career
Allen Brown was born on 3 July 1911. He was educated at Caulfield Grammar School, Wesley College and the University of Melbourne.

In 1949, Brown served as Secretary of the Department of Post-War Reconstruction. During his time at the Department, Brown was instrumental in establishing the Snowy Mountains Scheme.

Brown was Secretary of the Prime Minister's Department between August 1949 and December 1958. From the Prime Minister's Department, Brown's next appointment was in the diplomatic service, he was Deputy High Commissioner for Australia in the United Kingdom.

In 1965, Brown was appointed Australian Ambassador to Japan. While in that role, he led the Australian delegation which observed the 1967 South Vietnamese presidential election. The delegation was invited by the South Vietnamese Government, and Brown observed polling in Huế.

Brown retired from the Commonwealth public service in 1971.

Awards
Brown was made a Commander of the Order of the British Empire in January 1953. He was named a Knight Bachelor in January 1956.

Notes

References

1911 births
1999 deaths
Ambassadors of Australia to Japan
Australian Commanders of the Order of the British Empire
Australian public servants
Secretaries of the Department of the Prime Minister and Cabinet
20th-century Australian public servants